"Questions 67 and 68" is a 1969 song written by Robert Lamm for the rock band Chicago (then known as Chicago Transit Authority) and recorded for their debut album Chicago Transit Authority. It was their first single release. Peter Cetera is the primary lead singer with Lamm also on vocals. In 2015, Dave Swanson, writing for Ultimate Classic Rock, listed the song as ninth in a list of top ten Chicago songs. Writing for Rock Cellar magazine, Frank Mastropolo rated the song as number 11 in a list of "Top 11 Question Songs".

Lyrics and music
The questions in "Questions 67 and 68" relate to the nature of a romantic relationship Lamm had during 1967 and 1968. In 2008, Lamm said, " 'It’s about a girl I knew during those years with a hint of acid imagery and very Beatles influenced.' " The lyrics include the title phrase only as the last words.

With respect to the horn arrangement, James Pankow said in a 2000 Goldmine article, " 'In the old days, however, I used to write horns very harmonically. 'Questions 67 & 68' is probably a very good example of how I used to approach horns. I had no rests. We played from the first bar of the song, which is not very musical anymore. We got away with that then, I guess. Guercio [Chicago's producer then] used to triple, quite often. He'd have three sections, and the one in the middle was me playing pedals, that's why it sounded like Count Basie. It sounded like a big band.' "

Billboard described the single as "a soulful, driving rhythm ballad with big band in strong support," and as a "potent chart item."

Chart performance
After the band's success with subsequent singles, "Questions 67 and 68" was edited to a more radio-friendly length and was re-released in September 1971, with "I'm a Man" as the B-side.

Weekly charts

Japanese release
Cetera and Lamm recorded Japanese-language vocals for the song in 1971, and the version of the song with those vocals was released as a single in Japan.  Columbia Records released the song only as a radio-only promotional 45 rpm single, with the English version on the other side. This recording was released digitally in 1998 on the Japan-only compilation CD The Heart Of Chicago 1967-1971 Volume II Special Edition (green cover), which also contains "Lowdown" sung in Japanese.  The group performed the song live with the Japanese lyrics during tours of Japan in 1972, documented on the Live In Japan album, and again in 1995. The single's duration is incorrectly listed as 3:07, rather than 4:36, and omits the 22 second final sustained note.

Personnel
 Peter Cetera – lead vocals, bass
 Robert Lamm – backing and lead vocals, piano
 Terry Kath – guitar
 Danny Seraphine – drums
 Jimmy Pankow – trombone
 Lee Loughnane – trumpet
 Walt Parazaider – tenor saxophone

Cover versions
Panic! at the Disco sampled this song in "Hallelujah".
Leonid and Friends on Chicagovich

References

External links
 

1969 songs
1969 debut singles
1971 singles
Chicago (band) songs
Songs written by Robert Lamm
Song recordings produced by James William Guercio
Columbia Records singles